Jürgen Leitner (born 18 October 1975) is an Austrian former footballer who last played as a midfielder for Großrußbach.

Career

Leitner started his career with Austria Wien, Austria's most successful club.

In 2001, he signed for Xanthi in Greece, where he was voted as their best player.

At the age of 28, Leitner retired from professional football after almost signing for Spanish second division side Numancia.

References

External links

 

Austrian footballers
Living people
Association football midfielders
1975 births
Expatriate footballers in Greece
Austrian Football Bundesliga players
FK Austria Wien players
Super League Greece players
Xanthi F.C. players
First Vienna FC players
Wiener Sport-Club players
Floridsdorfer AC players
Austrian Regionalliga players
Austrian Landesliga players
Footballers from Vienna